Remittances to India are money transfers (called remittance) from non-resident Indians (NRIs) employed outside the country to family, friends or relatives residing in India. India is the world's top receiver of remittances, claiming more than 12% of the world's remittances in 2015. Remittances to India stood at  billion in 2017 and remittances from India to other countries totalled  billion, for a net inflow of  billion in 2017.

As per the Ministry of Overseas Indian Affairs (MOIA), remittance is received from the approximately 35 million members of the Indian diaspora.

History

Overview
Under the Foreign Exchange Management Act (FEMA) of 1999, Non Resident Indians (NRIs) and Persons of Indian Origin (PIOs) can open and maintain three types of accounts namely, Non-Resident Ordinary Rupee Account (NRO Account), Non-Resident (External) Rupee Account (NRE Account) and Foreign Currency Non Resident (Bank) Account – FCNR (B) Account. NRO Accounts are not repatriable except for all current income. Balances in an NRO account of NRIs/ PIOs are remittable up to US$1 (one) million per financial year (April–March) along with their other eligible assets. NRE Accounts are repatriable. Credits permitted to NRE account are inward remittance from outside India, interest accruing on the account, interest on investment, transfer from other NRE/ FCNR(B) accounts, maturity proceeds of investments (if such investments were made from this account or through inward remittance). Inward remittances from outside India, legitimate dues in India and transfers from other NRO accounts are permissible credits to NRO account.

Since 1991, India has experienced sharp remittance growth. In 1991 Indian remittances were valued at 2.1 billion USD; in 2006, they were estimated at between $22 billion and $25.7 billion. which grew to $67.6 billion in 2012-13, up from $66.1 billion the fiscal year, 2011-2012, when the remittance exceed the foreign direct investment(FDI) inflow of $46.84 billion into India.

Money is sent to India either electronically (for example, by SWIFT) or by demand draft. In recent years many banks are offering money transfers and this has grown into a huge business. Around 40% of the India's remittances flow to the states of Kerala, Tamil Nadu, Punjab, Andhra Pradesh and Uttar Pradesh which are among the top international remittance receiving states. Andhra Pradesh gets most of its remittance from the USA, Kerala from UAE, Punjab from Canada as most of the people migrate from their states to these countries. Tamil Nadu has the most diverse mix of remittance sources due to the presence of large Tamil diasporas in many countries like Australia, Canada, France, United Kingdom etc. with Malaysia, Singapore and the  United States being the largest sources of remittance. Research work on remittances to India is listed in the India Migration Bibliography.

In recent years many Indian Immigrants have used online money transfer services to send money from overseas to India. In recent years, many new Online and mobile companies have facilitated the transition to online remittances. Even some Indian banks have recently offered such services.

A 2012 study, by Reserve Bank of India revealed 30.8% of total foreign remittances was from West Asia, compared to 29.4% from North America and 19.5%  from Europe.

However, owing to the onslaught of COVID-19, the World Bank has estimated a 9% decline in the remittances to India.

Remittances to India by fiscal year
The following table illustrates the remittances to India as percent of GDP, 1990–1991 to 2005–2010.

Remittances to and from India by country
According to the World Bank estimated that a total of US$89.4 billion (2021) was made in remittances to India from other countries, and a total of US$7.01 billion (2020) was made in remittances to other countries from India. The following tables list the top ten source countries for remittances to India and the top ten destination countries for remittances from India in 2017. Somewhat different figures have been estimated by the Reserve Bank of India.

Remittances to India
According to the Pew Research Center, the top ten source countries for remittance to India in 2017 are as follows.
 (Figures for remittances between India and Pakistan are not available)

Remittances from India
According to the Pew Research Center. the top ten destination countries for remittance from India in 2017 are as follows.
 (Figures for remittances between India and Pakistan are not available.)

See also 
 Remittance related
 Global ranking of remittance by nations
 Hawala
 Hundi

 Indian economy related
 Economy of India
 Business process outsourcing to India
 Foreign trade of India
 List of exports of India
 Largest trading partners of India   

 Factors influencing remittances to India
 Indian diaspora
 Global ranking of remittance by nations
 Indosphere

 Others
Negotiable Instruments Act, 1881
Correspondent account

References

External links 
Ministry of Overseas Indian Affairs, Official website
Remittance Flows Worldwide in 2015 - Pew Research Center

I
Economy of India
Indian diaspora
Investment in India